Confession, released in the United States as The Deadliest Sin, is a 1955 British drama film directed by Ken Hughes and starring Sydney Chaplin, Audrey Dalton and John Bentley.

Production
The film was made at Merton Park Studios by Anglo-Amalgamated. Along with Little Red Monkey, released the same year, the film was an international hit and led to the company producing films with a higher production quality than they had previously, often importing American stars to give the films more international appeal.

Plot
A man stands in a large church. He enters a confessional box and tells the priest: "I have killed a man, Father".

After the title sequence, Mike Nelson arrives at an idyllic English country cottage in a chauffeur-driven car. He has an American accent as he has been in the USA working in the oil business for many years. He is greeted enthusiastically by his sister, but his elderly father is more reserved. His sister, Louise, shows him to his old room. Their childhood friend Alan is also there to welcome Mike. Alone in his room he unlocks his suitcase and cuts open a secret compartment full of packs of dollar bills. He hides the suitcase in a wardrobe.

At dinner in the family home he is surprised to receive a phone call. He recognises the voice - someone has tracked him down.

He goes to the bank to change a $50 bill, receiving £17 10s, but a man approaches him in the bank and asks for his "cut". They arrange to meet near the house. Mike goes home and takes a pistol from his case. Mike goes to the rendezvous point, a remote spot near a railway shunting yard; a scuffle starts when he pulls the gun, but Alan materialises, and Mike, who is on the verge of being killed by the other man, tells him to get the gun. Alan eventually picks up the pistol and shoots the man in order to stop him killing Mike. The man dies and they leave him there and drive off. They debate whether or not to tell the police. Alan wants to, as he only shot the man to stop him killing Mike, but Mike says if Alan goes to the police, he won't support Alan's story.

Meanwhile the police find the body, and tyre tracks leading from the scene.

Alan is deeply religious and decides to confess his crime, where the film began, but as he receives absolution a shot rings out. An unseen assailant has killed Alan. The priest gives him the last rites. The priest refuses to tell the police what had been confessed. The police suggest he too may become a target. The police compare the bullets and (wrongly) decide that both bodies have been killed by the same man. The police decide to compare the tyre tracks from the first murder to Alan's car and find a match. The police discover that Mike's alibi, that he was in a local pub with Alan, is false, but they cannot work out the connection.

The police inspector takes Louise to dinner. They start off companionably, but he then starts to talk about Mike and implies that he had been in trouble with the police in America, and tells her Alan and Mike lied about being in the pub on the night of the murder. He gains no information from her, and ends up just upsetting her. However, Louise, disturbed by the inspector's insinuations, searches Mike's room. When he catches her, he tells her that Alan murdered the man and he lied about the pub to protect their friend. Louise is unsure what to think, but says to Mike that if Alan killed the man, who killed Alan.

Mike goes to an upper class bar and a blonde picks him up. He goes back to her flat. She explains that her husband was killed in the Korean War. But Mike reads a newspaper headline and slips out.

The police start to work out what happened but have no proof. The priest holds the key to a conviction, and the police ask him to go about his work as usual, and they will watch him, in case the murderer comes after him, to which he agrees. Meanwhile Mike decides to leave the country and go to South Africa and starts booking a flight.

In the house Louise lockpicks Mike's suitcase and finds both the cash and the pistol. Mike confronts her and then confesses what happened both next to the railway and in the church. He says the truth will kill their father.

The police set a trap by telling the family that the priest has obtained special permission from Rome to give a statement about Alan's confession (which is untrue), and that he will do so the next morning. Louise leaves the house to visit an aunt, in order to keep away from Mike before he leaves, but the inspector, who is giving her a lift, tells her they are trying to trap her brother and she must stay with the police until Mike is apprehended. She sadly agrees to take part in the trap by taking a rerouted telephone call from Mike, pretending that she is at their aunt's house. Meanwhile, their father has come to realise that something is wrong and, when Mike tries to leave the house to kill the priest, he confronts Mike, blocking his way. Mike end up pushing his father out of his wheelchair to the floor and leaves the house, hearing his father call out 'Murderer!' as he goes. He heads for the church, but the police are watching. Mike hides in the organ loft and is just about to shoot the priest mid-service when the organ starts playing and throws him off aim. The police rush in, joined by Louise. Mike climbs to the bell tower, firing at the police, but is soon out of bullets. As the clockwork begins he is deafened by the bell ringing and falls to his death.

Cast
Sydney Chaplin as Mike Nelson 
Audrey Dalton as Louise Nelson 
John Bentley as Inspector Kessler 
Peter Hammond as Alan Poole
John Welsh as Father Neil 
Jefferson Clifford as Pop Nelson 
Patrick Allen as Corey the murdered man
Pat McGrath - Williams 
Robert Raglan as Becklan 
Betty Wolfe as Mrs. Poole, Alan's mother
Richard Huggett as Young priest 
Eddie Stafford as Photographer
Percy Herbert as Barman  
Felix Felton as Bar customer
Dorinda Stevens as blonde in the bar

References

Bibliography
Chibnall, Steve & McFarlane, Brian. The British 'B' Film. Palgrave Macmillan, 2009.

External links

Review of film at Variety

1955 crime drama films
British crime drama films
British black-and-white films
Films directed by Ken Hughes
1950s English-language films
1950s British films